Classic Praha is a classical music radio station in the Czech Republic.

External links
 Classic Praha (in Czech)

Radio stations in the Czech Republic

Radio stations established in 1994